Rudiloria kleinpeteri is a species of millipede in the family Xystodesmidae. Its distribution range is limited to an area in Virginia and West Virginia in the United States.

References

Further reading

External links

 

Xystodesmidae
Millipedes of North America